Club de Fútbol Monterrey, often known simply as Monterrey or their nickname Rayados, is a Mexican professional football club based in Monterrey, Nuevo León which currently plays in Liga MX, the top tier of Mexican football. Founded on 28 June 1945, it is the oldest active professional team from the northern part of Mexico. Since 1999 the club has been owned by FEMSA, Latin America's largest bottling company. Its home games have been played in the Estadio BBVA since 2015.

Monterrey has won five league titles, three domestic cups, and five CONCACAF Champions League titles (notably, three consecutive tournaments in 2011, 2012 and 2013). The team's nickname of Rayados (The Striped-Ones) stems from the club's traditional navy blue striped uniform. The uniform is reflected in the club's current crest, which is also decorated with stars above the crest representing the club's league titles and stars below representing continental titles. In terms of overall performance, it is the strongest club from Mexico and all of CONCACAF at the FIFA Club World Cup, with a fourth-place ranking in the all-time table. In 2020 Monterrey became the second Mexican club to complete the continental treble.

The club's oldest rival is Tigres UANL of the Autonomous University of Nuevo León. The local derby, known as the Clásico Regiomontano, is known for being one of the most heated and intensely competed derbies in Mexican football, as both teams consistently rank among the highest in attendance and currently feature the most expensive squads in the country.

History

1940s–50s

Club de Football Monterrey was founded on 28 June 1945, near the end of World War II by a group of industrial businessmen headed by Ramón Cárdenas Coronado, Enrique Ayala Medina, Paul C. Probert, Rogelio Cantú Gómez and Miguel Margáín Zozaya.

The team's nickname was popularly accepted, after the team's uniform, which is traditionally white with navy blue vertical stripes. Although the original uniform was white with a diagonal blue upper shoulder, the stripes were inspired in 1965, when the Tampico Madero (nicknamed "Jaibas Bravas", or Brave crabs) football team wore them, and the Monterrey team adopted them. Since then, the home uniform consists of vertical blue and white striped jerseys with blue shorts.

In its first professional game, played on 19 August 1945 against San Sebastián de León, Monterrey won 1–0, with José "Che" Gómez scoring the winner. That joy quickly came to an end, first by losing 6–0 to Montezuma, and then having the club's travelling bus involved in a tragic accident in the San Juan de los Lagos roads that would take the lives of many of the club's players and had a big impact on the surviving players. The other Mexican clubs in solidarity loaned players to Monterrey in order to continue playing the tournament, but the club struggled nevertheless; they lost 21 games in a row and conceded 121 goals that year, finishing last in the league. Due to these events, the club decided to stop playing in the league in 1946 in honor of the players who died.

It was not until 1952 when the club resumed action thanks to Dr. Carlos Canseco, president of the Asociación de Fútbol de Nuevo León. The club enrolled in the second division and just 4 years later the club earned promotion to the top division. Once again the joy was short-lived, when the club finished last in their first year back and was relegated once again to the second division after finishing with a record of 4 wins, 7 draws and 13 losses for a total of 15 points, just 1 short of Zacatepec who earned their permanence in the category. The club would once again earn the promotion in the 1959–60 season, and haven't been relegated since then.

1960s
The club started off the 1960s in bad shape, barely avoiding relegation with only 2 more points than Club Celaya, who had 19 points, in the 1960–61 season.

In the 1961–62 season the club was again close to relegation, finishing second to last for the second year in a row just one point ahead of Zacatepec, who had 18 points and was relegated. In the following season the club finally managed to have a decent campaign in the first division, finishing 5th in the league. In the 1963–64 season the club improved their performance and would finish 3rd in the league just 5 points behind champions Guadalajara who had 37 points. The following season the club would once again finish 3rd in the league, this time just 3 points behind Guadalajara who won its second consecutive league title with 40 points.

In the 1965–66 season the club finished tied for 4th in the league with Atlante on 33 points. In the 1966–67 season the club had a mediocre season, finishing tied for 8th in the league with Irapuato with 30 points each. This season is also remembered for Jabatos de Nuevo León's promotion to the first division, which meant 2 clubs from Monterrey would be participating in the first division for the first time. In the following seasons the club regularly finished in the middle of the league table.

1970s
In the 1970s the tournament was split into 2 short tournaments, due to the 1970 World Cup that was taking part in Mexico for the first time. The club was placed in group 1 where they managed to finish 2nd with 17 points, 1 less than group leader Toluca. In the second part of the tournament the club finished 7th. The following year Monterrey finished runner up to Club América who went on to win the league title that year against Toluca.

In the 1971–72 tournament the club qualified for the play-offs which had been introduced a few years back. The club would lose in quarterfinals to Club América 2–1 on aggregate. The following year the club missed out on the playoffs, finishing tied for 5th with Veracruz and Guadalajara each with 32 points. The following season the club managed to qualify for the quarterfinals where they once again were eliminated, this time by Atlético Español 5–6 on aggregate. 

In the 1975–76 tournament the club finished in first place with a total of 44 points by means of 16 wins, 12 draws and 10 losses. In quarterfinals the club played Cruz Azul and won 7–2 on aggregate. In the semifinals the club played Guadalajara who eliminated them with a score of 2–3 on aggregate. During 1975, the Portuguese superstar Eusébio played for the club.

In the 1976–77 and 1977–78 seasons, the club failed to qualify for the playoffs, finishing 4th both times. In the 1977–78 season, crosstown rival Tigres UANL won its first league title.

In the 1978–79 tournament the club once again qualified to the playoffs finishing 1st in group one with a total of 40 points by means of 14 wins 12 draws and 12 losses. This time a short tournament was played by the best 8 teams in the league who were then split into 2 groups. Monterrey was placed in group 2 along with Pumas UNAM, Tigres UANL and Zacatepec. After 6 rounds of play the club finished in 3rd place with 6 points, just 2 points behind Pumas UNAM who went on to lose against Cruz Azul, the winners of the other group. In the 1979–80 tournament the club finished 3rd in group 1 with 34 points but failed to qualify for the playoffs again. The decade came to an end with "Rayados" having shown great effort, as they qualified a couple times for the playoffs, but failed to win their first league title.

1980s
On 1 March 1986, the Rayados won their first league title in the return leg of a series against Tampico-Madero in the Estadio Tecnológico during the Torneo México 86, winning by an aggregate 3–2 score. The goals were scored by Brazilian Reinaldo Güeldini, who scored from a penalty after Mario Bahia was fouled, and Mexican 20 year-old Francisco Javier "El Abuelo" Cruz, who finished the season as the league's top scorer. For many years, the team's logo did not show the star of the first league title, up until 2003.

The next season, the team signed several players, including Brazilian midfielder Ricardo Ferretti, but the team had an inconsistent season and would finish the remaining years of the decade without lifting a trophy.

In the year 1989, the hymn of Rayados was created by compositor Luis Aguilé. It is considered by Monterrey's fans as one of the symbols of identity of the team.

1990s
At the beginning of the decade, Monterrey signed two notable players, Carlos Hermosillo and Manuel Negrete, for the 1990–91 season. The next season, they won their first Copa MX after defeating CD Juarez 4–2 in the Estadio Tecnológico and then went on to reach the league final of the 1992–93 season, losing to Atlante.

While the early years of the decade seemed promising for Monterrey, the latter half of the decade would prove to be a disappointing one, as financial problems started to become a problem for the club. During this period, the club sold many players who would go on to have successful careers with other teams like Ramón Morales and Sinha. Young talent Jesus Arellano was sold to Guadalajara in 1997, though he returned to the club in 2000 and spent the next eleven years as captain before retiring in 2011.

One of the most memorable moments of this decade was the so-called "Clasico del Descenso" in the 1995–96 season. On 24 March 1996, Monterrey defeated their arch-rivals Tigres 2–1 at Estadio Universitario. Tigres were facing a relegation battle after years of poor results, and needed a victory to avoid being relegated; the defeat meant that Tigres would be relegated for the first and so far only time in their history to the Segunda División.

In 1999, Monterrey was facing a fierce relegation battle of its own against Puebla, culminating on May 9, 1999, when the teams faced each other at the Estadio Tecnológico to decide which team would get relegated. Monterrey only needed a draw to stay in the Primera División, and with a memorable performance from Francisco Javier "El Abuelo" Cruz who had played a vital role in Monterrey's first title win thirteen years before, Monterrey managed to draw 1–1 and stay in the Mexican Primera División.

21st century

In 2002, Monterrey hired Argentinian coach Daniel Passarella and started to form a strong and competitive side featuring the likes of Guillermo Franco, Walter Erviti, Jesus Arellano and Luis Perez. In the Clausura 2003 tournament, they won their second title. In the semi-finals, they faced their arch-rivals Tigres for the first time ever in a Liguilla. In the first leg, they won 4–1 at the Estadio Universitario, and despite losing 2–1 at their home ground in the second leg, they managed to advance to the finals with an aggregate victory of 5–3. On June 14, 2003, they defeated Monarcas Morelia by an aggregate of 3–1 to claim their second league title after 17 years.

Pasarella left in 2004, and afterwards, Monterrey hired Miguel Herrera to be their head coach. He led them to the finals of the Apertura 2004, but the club lost against Club Universidad Nacional by an aggregate of 3–1. He would lead them to the finals again in the Apertura 2005 tournament, this time losing to Deportivo Toluca F.C. by an aggregate of 6–3. After the loss, Guillermo Franco left the club to play for Spanish club Villarreal CF. Herrera would remain their head coach until 2007, when he was fired after a poor string of results in the Apertura 2007. For the Clausura 2008, Monterrey hired Ricardo La Volpe to be their head coach, and they managed to reach the semi-finals. This team featured new players such as Humberto Suazo and newly acquired league veteran striker Jared Borgetti. However, the next tournament was a poor one for Rayados, as they finished in 14th place.

The Vucetich Era (2009–13)

In 2009, Monterrey hired coach Víctor Manuel Vucetich and formed a team that would become one of the strongest in the league, with an attack led by Humberto Suazo and new acquisition Aldo de Nigris, a midfield featuring veteran players Luis Ernesto Perez and Jesus Arellano along with Walter Ayovi and a defence led by Jose Maria Basanta, Duilio Davino and goalkeeper Jonathan Orozco. They won their third league title, the Apertura 2009 tournament, with an aggregate 6–4 victory against Cruz Azul in the finals. The first leg was played at the Estadio Tecnológico, where Monterrey overcame a 3–1 deficit to win the game 4–3. The second leg was played at the Estadio Azul, with Monterrey winning 2–1. Thus, after a six-year wait Monterrey lifted their third league title.

In the next tournament, Humberto Suazo left to play for Spanish club Real Zaragoza, but nonetheless, Monterrey managed to finish on top of the table for the first time in their history. However, they would be eliminated in the quarter-finals by Pachuca. Suazo returned to Rayados for the Apertura 2010 tournament, and they managed to win their fourth league title when they defeated Santos Laguna in the finals. Although they lost 3–2 in the first leg, they were able to make a comeback and win 3–0 in the second leg at the Estadio Tecnológico, with Humberto Suazo and Jose Basanta scoring two and one goals, respectively. With an aggregate score of 5–3, Monterrey claimed their fourth title.

Monterrey secured a place in the 2010–11 CONCACAF Champions League and won the tournament for the first time in their history. They faced Real Salt Lake in the Finals and won 3–2 on aggregate to claim their first CONCACAF Champions League title and the third title in the Vucetich Era.

The following year, they reached the finals of the Clausura 2012 league tournament and the 2011–12 CONCACAF Champions League. Both finals were against the same opponent, Santos Laguna. Rayados were seeking to win their fifth league title and their second Champions League title. They lost the Clausura 2012 finals against Santos Laguna but won the finals of the Champions League against Santos with an aggregate of 3–2 to claim their second consecutive CONCACAF title.

Monterrey reached the finals of the 2012–13 CONCACAF Champions League for the third consecutive time. They faced Santos Laguna in a repeat of the previous year's final. They drew 0–0 in the first leg. In the second leg, Santos built a 2–0 lead with goals from Darwin Quintero and former Rayados player Felipe Baloy. However, Monterrey managed to make a dramatic comeback and scored four goals, with a brace from Aldo de Nigris and a goal each from Humberto Suazo and Neri Cardozo. Monterrey won their third consecutive CONCACAF Champions League title and the fifth overall title in the Vucetich Era. This solidified them as the best Mexican soccer team of all time. Although they enjoyed tremendous success in the CONCACAF Champions League, they did not return to the following tournament as they could not reach any league finals during the 2012–13 Liga MX season and thus could not get a chance to try and become the first team to win the tournament four times in a row.

Monterrey started the 2013–14 season with a lot of changes. Aldo de Nigris left the club to join Chivas, and Walter Ayovi joined Pachuca. By now, players like Jesus Arellano and Duilio Davino had retired, and long-time club players like Luis Ernesto Perez had left the club. With the arrival of new players like Dorlan Pabon and Leobardo Lopez, Monterrey was ready for the Apertura 2013 tournament. However, a string of poor results and the shock early departure of Pabon would prove to be a threat as Monterrey started the tournament poorly. On August 25, 2013, Rayados announced that Vucetich had stepped down as coach, and thus the Vucetich Era, which earned the club a total of five titles in four years, came to an end.

Post-Vucetich period (2013–15)

Rayados hired José Guadalupe Cruz to become the new manager of the team, and although they managed to reach the semi-finals of the domestic cup, the Copa MX, they failed to qualify to the playoffs of the Apertura 2013 tournament. After a bad start to the Clausura 2014, they fired Cruz on February 18, 2014, after only 17 league games coached.
	
Monterrey replaced Cruz with Carlos Barra, who had worked as an assistant coach for Vucetich. Although they failed to reach the playoffs for the second consecutive tournament, the team kept Barra for the 2014–15 season. Colombian striker Dorlan Pabon re-joined the team, and with new signings such as Stefan Medina and Pablo Barrera, Monterrey started the Apertura 2014 tournament with high expectations. They managed to secure 6th place and returned to the playoffs for the first time since Vucetich had managed the club. The club had a strike partnership of Dorlan Pabon and Humberto Suazo, with Pabon scoring 11 goals. The club reached the semi-finals but lost 3–0 on aggregate against the eventual champions Club América in what would prove to be Suazo's last games with the club before returning to Colo-Colo. Suazo had scored over 102 league goals in a seven-year span and became the all-time top scorer for the club at the time.
	
The team started the Clausura 2015 tournament in poor form, losing four of their first six games, and on February 15, the team fired Barra and replaced him with two-time Liga MX champion Antonio Mohamed, who had led Club América to the league championship the previous tournament. Mohamed had played for Rayados during his years as a player. He was part of the squad that managed to avoid relegation in 1999. Monterrey did not qualify to the playoffs under Mohamed, but the club were keen on keeping him for the 2015–16 season. That season would prove to be a special one as the team were moving to a new home ground, the Estadio BBVA Bancomer. In the summer, Rayados made new signings, including midfielder Walter Gargano, striker Rogelio Funes Mori and re-signed Jose Maria Basanta, who had left for Italian side Florentina after the 2014 FIFA World Cup. Former club veterans Aldo de Nigris and Luis Ernesto Pérez also returned to the club, along with the promotion to the first team of promising young center back Cesar Montes. Rayados had a formidable attacking trio of Dorlan Pabon, Rogelio Funes Mori and Edwin Cardona, who had signed with Monterrey during the winter of 2015. They narrowly missed the playoffs of the Apertura 2015 tournament, but their offense was lauded by many as one of the best in the league.

Tenure of Antonio Mohamed (2015–2018)
After failing to qualify for the playoffs in 2015, the club loaned several players to other clubs in the league. Players such as Stefan Medina and Severo Meza were loaned to Pachuca and Sinaloa, respectively. In the winter of 2016, the team acquired club veteran Walter Ayovi who had left the club in 2013 and River Plate midfielder Carlos Sánchez who had won the Copa Libertadores a few months prior. The team began the Clausura 2016 tournament in great form by winning their first three games. They went on to have their best regular season in years by finishing on top of the league with 37 points, seven points ahead of second place Pachuca. The team's success was primarily due to their attacking trio composed of Pabon, Funes Mori and Cardona, with midfielder Carlos Sanchez providing several goals and assists.

The team entered the playoffs as favourites to win the title. In the quarterfinals, they faced their arch-rivals and defending league champions Tigres UANL, the first leg was played at the Estadio Universitario where Monterrey won 3–1. The away leg was played at the BBVA Bancomer, where Tigres won 2–1 despite several penalties that were controversially awarded to Monterrey. Monterrey advanced to the semi-finals with a 4–3 aggregate victory and extended their record of never being eliminated by Tigres in the playoffs. In the semi-finals, they faced América, losing the first leg at the Estadio Azteca 1–0. In the second leg, they faced them at home and pulled off a dramatic 4–2 victory, in what was described by some pundits as one of the best games in the history of the playoffs. They advanced to the league finals where they would face Pachuca. Controversy arose when it was confirmed that Carlos Sanchez would not be able to play the finals as the Uruguay national team had called him up for the upcoming Copa América Centenario. In the league finals against Pachuca, Monterrey lost the first leg 1–0 at the Estadio Hidalgo, with the sole goal coming from striker Franco Jara. The second leg took place at the Estadio BBVA Bancomer in what was its first ever final since it was inaugurated the year before. On May 29, in front of 53,000 spectators, the final was played. Monterrey opened the scoring in the 39th minute with a shot from Dorlan Pabon to level the aggregate 1–1. Veteran goalkeeper Óscar Pérez had several key saves for Pachuca, and in the closing minutes of the game, a header from Victor Guzman in the 93rd minute gave the title to Pachuca in what was described by the Mexican media as a heart-breaking defeat for Monterrey.

The following tournament ended in disappointment as the team narrowly failed to qualify to the playoffs of the Apertura 2016. However, it also saw the return of Rayados to the CONCACAF Champions League after a three-year absence, having won the tournament three times in a row under Vucetich. The team had high hopes to redeem itself after their league title loss; however, the team was shockingly eliminated in the group stage after finishing second in their group behind Panamanian club Arabe Unido.

In the Apertura 2017 season, Monterrey finished the regular season in first place with 37 points and advanced to playoffs. In quarterfinals, Monterrey beat Atlas 2–1 in the first leg and 4–1 in the second, a 6-2 aggregate. Monterrey faced Morelia in semifinals, winning 1–0 in the away leg and 4–0 in the home leg, a 5-0 aggregate. Monterrey advanced to the final against arch rival Tigres UANL. In the first leg, the teams tied 1–1 at the Estadio Universitario. In the second leg at the Estadio BBVA Bancomer, Tigres beat Monterrey 2–1 with goals from Edu Vargas and Francisco Meza.

Appointment of Diego Alonso (2018–2019) 

After announcing the appointment of Diego Alonso in July 2018, the club would have a great run in the Copa MX. Despite beating Querétaro F.C. 1–0 in the quarter finals and C.F. Pachuca on penalties in the semi finals, the club would fall short losing 2–0 to CD Cruz Azul in Copa MX Apertura final.  Monterrey would finish third in the Liga MX Clausura and fifth in the Liga MX Apertura giving them a playoff spot in both competitions. They would advance to the semifinals in the Clausura playoffs, beating Necaxa but losing to Tigres UANL on a league position decider after a 1–1 draw. In the Apertura playoffs they would have to face the same faith, going on to the semi-finals of the competition, beating Santos Laguna 3–0 on aggregate in the quarter finals until facing CD Cruz Azul and falling short on a league position decider after a 1–1 draw. In the CONCACAF Champions League, they would go on winning the continental tournament after convincingly beating Sporting Kansas City 10–2 on aggregate in the semi-final and finally beating Tigres UANL in the CONCACAF Champions League final in a 2–1 win in aggregate score. This championship was significant to the city, and seen as a kind of revenge for the domestic final lost to Tigres, and is known in the city as "the star that shines the most".

In the Apertura 2019 season, Diego Alonso would be dismissed from his post having more defeats than victories in the Apertura.

Reappointment of Antonio Mohamed (2019–2020) 
On 14 October, Antonio Mohamed was reappointed as the manager of Monterrey. The club would find themselves in a good run in the Club World Cup, advancing to the semi-finals after beating Al Sadd 3–2, ultimately the club would lose to Liverpool F.C. after a stoppage time winner by Roberto Firmino. The club would beat Al Hilal on penalties, earning a third place medal in the 2019 FIFA Club World Cup.  That same month, despite the club finishing 8th on the Apertura general table, they would go on to reach the championship finals against América and defeat them in penalties, winning 4–2 and securing their 5th championship league trophy.

Culture

Colours

Since the club's founding in 1945, the colours used by the club have been white and blue, with varied use from the usual stripes. The shade of the blue itself has been in constant change, ranging from navy and cobalt to slightly lighter tones. The third colour has also been inconsistent, sometimes presented as being red, orange and cyan, and recently, violet, purple or green.

Youth development 
The club has constantly emphasized home-grown (cantera) players and has produced international players such as Francisco Javier Cruz, Héctor Becerra, Missael Espinoza, Jesús Arellano, Antonio de Nigris, Severo Meza, Jonathan Orozco, Jesús Zavala, Hiram Mier, Jesús Manuel Corona, César Montes, Jonathan González, and Carlos Rodríguez among others.

Rivalry

Rayados' biggest rival is Tigres UANL. This rivalry is called the Clásico Regiomontano. Monterrey and Tigres are both known to sell out all of their home games regardless of weather conditions and the teams' status. For Clásico matches, the stadium is sold out as soon as tickets go on sale. The rivalry has been labeled as the most intensely competed rivalry in Mexican football

As of August 2022, there have been a total of 128 official Clásico games, Tigres has been victorious in 47 of them, while Monterrey has won 42, and a total of 39 games have been draws. Monterrey and Tigres played their first Clásico on 13 July 1974 in the Estadio Universitario, with the match ending in a 1–1 draw. Monterrey would be the first team to win the Clásico in their second confrontation, 2–1. Almost all their first encounters were played in the Estadio Universitario, with averages of 70,000 fans attending these games, which were before the stadium renovation. In addition, there were also another six "non-official" games before the first official Clásico, in five of which Rayados were victorious. 

Monterrey has recently held somewhat of a regional rivalry with state neighbors Santos Laguna, whom they have played a total of four finals, with Monterrey winning three of them and Santos one. It is known by many as La Nortena.

Fan base

Los Rayados supporters constantly fill the Estadio BBVA Bancomer. They had the highest average Liga MX attendance (50,000 per game) in 2016. The city of Monterrey claims and does have Mexico's most loyal supporting crowds for their teams, due to the city having the only venues that regularly sell-out in the Primera División. There is a rivalry between the La Adicción, a C.F. Monterrey support crowd, and the Libres y Lokos, a Tigres UANL support crowd, each time a Clásico takes place.

Rayados Kids

In 2017 Rayados C.f. launched its YouTube and YouTube Kids original series, Rayados Kids, dedicated to creating content for children who love the team, in interview style format with the team players and original stories revolving around the teams actual positioning on soccer leagues. The web garnered around six thousand subscriptions and one million views in its first year.

Rayados Christmas Campaign

Since 2010 Rayados teammates have joined to wish a merry Christmas to its fans, by filming their annual holiday campaign. It has become a tradition to include a new rendition of their famous crowd chant song "corrido de monterrey" each year on their holiday video, showing their fans how their passion lives "en la vida y en la cancha".

Grounds
Monterrey played their home matches at the Estadio Tecnológico from 1950 to 2015, though for a period of time from 1973 to 1980 they played at the Estadio Universitario, the stadium was opened on July 17, 1950, by Mexican president Miguel Alemán Valdés, it was the second oldest football stadium in Mexico, after Estadio Azul. The stadium was a part of the 1986 Mexico FIFA World Cup which could hold 38,000 people, and served 4 matches within the tournament but, in July 2017 the stadium began to be demolished.

In 1977–78, with preparations for the 1977 CONCACAF Championship underway at the Estadio Universitario, both Tigres and Rayados played at the Estadio Tecnológico, including the first Clásico Regio derby held in the stadium; it would be the first of 42 meetings between the two clubs venue, with the final fixture being a 2–2 draw in October 2014.
Monterrey won league titles in 1986 (Mexico 1986) and Apertura 2010 in the venue, as well as the Copa MX in 1991 and the CONCACAF Champions League in 2012–13.In July 2015, Monterrey moved to a new stadium called Estadio BBVA, located in Guadalupe, Nuevo León, in Greater Monterrey. The new stadium currently has a capacity of 53,500 people. The stadium has similar features of those incorporated within the design of England's Wembley Stadium and the Aviva Stadium in Ireland. The stadium was inaugurated on 2 August 2015 in a friendly match for the eighth edition of the Eusébio Cup, where Monterrey defeated Benfica 3–0 hosting in front of a sold-out crowd.

Estadio BBVA, designed by Christopher Lee of Populous, started its development in October 2011, and included plans for reforestation and environmental healing for the decaying area that surrounds the construction site. The stadium was developed by FEMSA which costed around US$200 million. It is seen as one of the most beautiful stadiums in Mexico, it has the fourth largest capacity crowd in Mexico. It has an authentic grass surface, suites, a club-themed Restaurant, a club lounge, and high-end interior and exterior design. The inclination of the grandstand is 34 degrees and with the minimum distance allowed by FIFA to provide unsurpassed closeness to the action.

On 29 May 2016, Monterrey played their first final in their new stadium in front of 50,000 fans against Pachuca for the Clausura 2016 championship, which they tied 1–1, but lost 2–1 on aggregate.

Kits and sponsorship

Kit evolution

The original uniform was a shirt that was split diagonally across the chest with blue and white at each side, with white shorts and navy blue socks. In 1955 after winning the second division the club used a white shirt with two horizontal blue lines across the chest. In the 1960s the club wore a different kit inspired by the one used by Jaibos Tampico Madero with vertical baby blue lines with white shorts and socks. It was in 1962 when D. José Ramón Ballina introduced the kit that the club still uses to date, inspired by Asturias FC, a club he had played in Mexico City.

In the 1970s, many models emerged, some with broad, thicker stripes, and blue and black combinations, but the most significant change occurred in the mid-1980s when the color of the T-shirt changed from royal blue to navy blue, a colour that is still in use today.

Atletica was the kit manufacturer from 1999 to 2007, followed by American company Nike which manufactured the kits from 2007 to 2014. Afterwards, Monterrey signed a contract with German sportswear manufacturer Puma which has been making the team's kit ever since.

Sponsors

Honours

National competitions
Primera División / Liga MX
Winners (5): Mexico '86, Clausura 2003, Apertura 2009, Apertura 2010, Apertura 2019

Copa México / Copa MX
Winners (3): 1991–92, Apertura 2017, 2019–20

InterLiga
Winners (1): 2010

Campeón de Campeones
Winners (1): 1992

Runners–up (1): 2003

Supercopa MX
Runners–up (1): 2018

Segunda División
Winners (2): 1955–56, 1959–60

Second Division Super Cup
Winners (1): 1956

International competitions
CONCACAF Champions League
Winners (5): 2010–11, 2011–12, 2012–13, 2019, 2021

CONCACAF Cup Winners Cup
Winners (1): 1993

FIFA Club World Cup
Third place (2): 2012, 2019

Friendly tournaments
Eusébio Cup (1): 2015
 2nd place Trofeo Ciudad de la Línea (Spain, 1979)
 2nd place: Ciudad de Alicante Trophy (Spain, 1979)
 2nd place: Ciudad de Jerez Trophy (Spain, 1979)
 Los Angeles Nations Cup (1): 1991
 Copa Gobernador de Nuevo León (1): 1992
 Subcampeón del Torneo Ría de Aveiro (Portugal): 1995
 Subcampeón del Trofeo Ciudad de Santiago de Compostela (Spain): 1995
 Copa Rial (Pontevedra, España) (1): 1995
 Copa Movistar (1): 2002
 International Challenge Cup (1): 2003
 Torneo de Verano Miller Lite (1): 2004
 Copa Chiapas(1): 2006
 Trofeo Santos Laguna 25 Aniversario (1): 2008
 Chicago Mayor's Cup (1): 2009
 Copa 100 años de la UNAM (1): 2010

Personnel

Management

Coaching staff

Players

First-team squad

Out on loan

Reserve teams

Raya2
Reserve team that plays in the Liga de Expansión MX in the second level of the Mexican league system.

Top scorers

Most appearances

 Players in bold are currently active with Club de Fútbol Monterrey.
 Does not count appearances in international competitions.

Managers

 Roberto Scarone (1962–65)
 Mario Perez (1966–69)
 Ignacio "El Gallo" Jáuregui (1969–74)
 Fernando Riera (1975–76)
 Bira (1976)
 Luis Firpo (1976–77)
 Fernando Riera (1977–78)
 Otto Glória (1978–79)
 Gustavo Peña (1979)
 Bira (1979–80)
 Pedro Dellacha (1980–81)
 Héctor Hugo Eugui (1981–82)
 Vicente Pereda (1982–83)
 Roberto Matosas (1983–84)
 Francisco Avilán (1984–87)
 José Ledezma (1987–89)
 Fernando Riera (1989)
 Pedro García (1989–91)
 Carlos Alberto Torres (1991–92)
 Miguel Mejía Barón (1 July 1991 – 30 June 93)
 Hugo Hernández (1993–94)
 Magdaleno Cano (1994), (1997), (1999)
 Arturo Salah (1 July 1994 – 30 June 97)
 Claudio Lostanau (1997)
 Tomás Boy (1 July 1997 – 30 June 98)
 José Treviño (22 Jan 1999 – 1 March 99)
 Carlos Jara Saguier (4 March 1999 – 30 June 99)
 Eduardo Solari (1999)
 Benito Floro (12 Nov 1999 – 30 June 2001)
 Daniel Passarella (1 July 2002 – 31 Dec 2003)
 Hugo de León (2004)
 Sergio Orduña (20 April 2004 – 30 June 2004)
 Miguel Herrera (1 July 2004–16 Sept 2007)
 Isaac Mizrahi Smeke (1 Oct 2007 – 10 Jan 2008)
 Ricardo La Volpe (12 Jan 2008 – 8 Jan 2009)
 Víctor Manuel Vucetich (9 Jan 2009 – 26 Aug 2013)
 José Guadalupe Cruz (27 Aug 2013 – 18 Feb 2014)
 C. Barra & J. Treviño (interim) (19 Feb 2014 – 16 May 2014)
 Carlos Barra (16 May 2014 – 15 February 2015)
 Antonio Mohamed (16 February 2015 – 7 May 2018) 
 Diego Alonso (18 May 2018 – 30 September 2019)
 Antonio Mohamed (9 October 2019 – 25 November 2020)
 Javier Aguirre (7 December 2020 – 26 February 2022)
 Víctor Manuel Vucetich (2 March 2022 –)

References

External links

 

 
Football clubs in Mexico
Association football clubs established in 1945
Liga MX teams
C.F. Monterrey
1945 establishments in Mexico
M
M